Amanita marmorata is a species of Amanita found in South Australia

References

External links

marmorata
Fungi of Australia